Ali Hidayat oghlu Asadov (born 30 November 1956) is an Azerbaijani politician serving as the Prime Minister of Azerbaijan following his appointment to the post on 8 October 2019 by president Ilham Aliyev.

Early life 
Ali Asadov was born on 30 November 1956 in Baku. In 1974 he graduated from secondary school No.134 in Baku, and entered the Plekhanov Russian University of Economics in Moscow, from which he graduated in 1978. He served in the Soviet Army from 1978 to 1980.

In 1980, he began working as a chief laboratory assistant at the Institute of Economics of the Academy of Sciences of the Azerbaijan SSR.  Asadov continued his education at the Institute of Economics of the USSR Academy of Sciences in Moscow between 1981 and 1984, where he got his post-graduate diploma in Economics.

In 1989-1995, Ali Asadov worked as an associate Professor and head of the Department at the Baku Institute of Social Management and Political Science.

Career

In the 1st Azerbaijan Parliamentary Election held on 12 November 1995, Ali Asadov was elected an MP by proportional representation for the term of 1995-2000, representing New Azerbaijan Party.

On 17 April 1998, he was appointed assistant of the Azerbaijani President for economic affairs. According to the decree of the President Ilham Aliyev dated 30 November 2012, Asadov was appointed as the deputy head of the Presidential Administration and in 2017 an assistant of the President of Azerbaijan for economic affairs. Asadov has been considered a close ally of President Aliyev. In October 2019, following Novruz Mammadov's resignation, he was elected Prime Minister by a vote of 105 to 0. He heads the 8th Government of Azerbaijan.

Awards 

 Order “For Service to the Motherland” of the second degree (2012)
 Order “For Service to the Motherland” of first degree (2016)

References

1956 births
Living people
Azerbaijani politicians
Prime Ministers of Azerbaijan
Azerbaijani professors
20th-century Azerbaijani economists
Plekhanov Russian University of Economics alumni
Recipients of the Azerbaijan Democratic Republic 100th anniversary medal
21st-century Azerbaijani economists